The Port of Calapan or the Calapan Baseport is a seaport in Calapan, Oriental Mindoro in the Philippines. It is the main port serving Oriental Mindoro. The port has at least seven berths which can accommodate fastcraft, conventional and RoRo vessels. Primary items handled at the port are agricultural products such as copra, rice, and bananas for outgoing cargo and cement, fertilizer and general commodities for incoming cargo.

Its passenger terminal can accommodate 800 people at a time, and is being expanded to accommodate 3,500 passengers. Upon completion, the Port of Calapan will have the biggest seaport terminal in the Philippines by passenger capacity. The expansion is set to be completed in February 2023 and is projected to be operational by the following month.

References

Calapan Port
Buildings and structures in Oriental Mindoro
Calapan